The Louie Show is an American sitcom television series that aired on CBS from January 31 until March 6, 1996 co-created by and starring comedian Louie Anderson.

Premise
A psychotherapist in Duluth, Minnesota deals with his friends and family.

Cast
Louie Anderson as Dr. Louie Lundgren
Bryan Cranston as Det. Curt Sincic
Paul Feig as Dr. Jake Reinhardt
Kate Hodge as Gretchen Lafayette
Laura Innes as Sandy Sincic
Nancy Becker-Kennedy as Helen
Kimmy Robertson as Kimmy

Episodes

References

External links
 
The Louie Show @ Perfectduluthday.com

1996 American television series debuts
1996 American television series endings
1990s American sitcoms
English-language television shows
CBS original programming
Television shows set in Minnesota